Sylvan Lake is a lake located in Custer State Park, in the Black Hills of South Dakota, United States. It was created in 1891 when Theodore Reder built a dam (the Sylvan Lake Water Dam) across Sunday Gulch Creek. The lake area offers picnic places, rock climbing, small rental boats, swimming, and hiking trails. It is also popular as a starting point for excursions to Black Elk Peak and The Needles. A hotel was operated on the shore of the lake in the early 20th century .

The lake was featured in Disney's 2007 film National Treasure: Book of Secrets. The film made the lake appear to be located directly behind Mount Rushmore when in reality it is actually five miles southwest of Mount Rushmore.

See also
List of South Dakota lakes

References

Reservoirs in South Dakota
Protected areas of Custer County, South Dakota
Black Hills
Bodies of water of Custer County, South Dakota